La Pinilla is a ski area situated near the town of Riaza (Segovia) in the Sierra de Ayllón, 100 kilometres away from Madrid (Spain).

Resort 
It has 20 km of marked pistes. The base of the area is situated at 1497 m AMSL. The highest point is the Pico del Lobo, 2273 m AMSL, with a vertical drop of 776 m. La Pinilla has 189 artificial snow cannons.

Lifts
All of the resort's lifts are modern and of high capacity, the resort has:

 1 gondola lift 
 3 chair lifts 
 7 ski tows.

Pistes
The resort offers 23 pistes of different difficulties:
 4 beginners. 
  6 easy.
  13 intermediate.

Services

 3 restaurants.
 1 skiing school.
 1 snow gardens for children.
 2 ski hiring stores.
 ATM

External links
 http://www.lapinilla.es - Official resort site.

Ski areas and resorts in Spain
Sports venues in Castile and León
Sierra de Ayllón